Cornelius Booth is an actor best known for his role as Colonel Fitzwilliam in the 2005 adaptation of Pride & Prejudice.

Filmography
 Trauma (2004) ... Orderly
 Pride & Prejudice (2005) ... Colonel Fitzwilliam
 Penelope (2006) ... Pub Patron 1
 Robin Hood (2018) ... Lord Pembroke

External links

British male film actors
Living people
Year of birth missing (living people)
Place of birth missing (living people)
British male television actors
21st-century British male actors